2015 Islamabad earthquake occurred at   on July 24 in Pakistan. It registered a moment magnitude of 5.1. Collapsed homes left at least three people dead in Abbottabad.

See also
 List of earthquakes in Pakistan
 List of earthquakes in 2015

References

External links
Deadly earthquake Pakistan on Earthquake Report Website

Islamabad
Islamabad earthquake
Islamabad 2015
Islamabad earthquake